Lebanon County ( Pennsylvania Dutch: Lebanon Kaundi) is a county in the Commonwealth of Pennsylvania. As of the 2010 census, the population was 133,568. Its county seat is the city of Lebanon.

The county was formed from portions of Dauphin and Lancaster counties in 1813, with minor boundary revisions in 1814 and 1821. Lebanon County comprises the Lebanon, Pennsylvania, metropolitan statistical area, which is part of the Harrisburg–York–Lebanon combined statistical area.

Lebanon is 72 miles northwest of Philadelphia, which is the nearest major city.

Geography
Most of it is drained by the Swatara Creek into the Susquehanna River while some eastern portions are drained by the Tulpehocken Creek (which originates in the county near Myerstown) eastward into the Schuylkill River. It consists in large part of a valley.

Climate
The county has a hot-summer humid continental climate (Dfa) and the hardiness zone is 6b except along the northern boundary with Dauphin where it is 6a. Average monthly temperatures in center-city Lebanon range from 29.4 °F in January to 74.3 °F in July.

Adjacent counties
 Schuylkill County (northeast)
 Berks County (east)
 Lancaster County (south)
 Dauphin County (west and northwest)

Major highways

Demographics

As of the census of 2000, there were 120,327 people and 32,771 families residing in the county.  The population density was 332 people per square mile (128/km2).  There were 49,320 housing units at an average density of 136 per square mile (53/km2).  The racial makeup of the county was 94.46% White, 1.29% Black or African American, 0.13% Native American, 0.89% Asian, 0.04% Pacific Islander, 2.26% from other races, and 0.94% from two or more races.  4.96% of the population were Hispanic or Latino of any race. 45.6% were of German, 11.8% American and 6.1% Irish ancestry. 92.5% spoke English, 4.2% Spanish and 1.1% Pennsylvania Dutch as their first language.

There were 46,551 households, out of which 30.40% had children under the age of 18 living with them, 57.40% were married couples living together, 9.20% had a female householder with no husband present, and 29.60% were non-families. 25.20% of all households were made up of individuals, and 11.10% had someone living alone who was 65 years of age or older.  The average household size was 2.49 and the average family size was 2.98.

In the county, the population was spread out, with 23.70% under the age of 18, 8.20% from 18 to 24, 28.00% from 25 to 44, 23.70% from 45 to 64, and 16.40% who were 65 years of age or older.  The median age was 39 years. For every 100 females there were 95.00 males.  For every 100 females age 18 and over, there were 91.70 males.

2020 census

Metropolitan Statistical Area
The U.S. Office of Management and Budget has designated Lebanon County as the Lebanon, PA metropolitan statistical area (MSA).  As of the 2010 U.S. census the metropolitan area ranked 16th most populous in the State of Pennsylvania and the 296th most populous in the United States with a population of 133,568.  Lebanon County is also a part of the larger Harrisburg–York–Lebanon combined statistical area (CSA), which combines the populations of Lebanon County as well as Adams, Cumberland, Dauphin, Perry, and York Counties in Pennsylvania. The combined statistical ara ranked 5th largest in the state and 43rd largest in the U.S. with a population of 1,219,422.

Politics and government

|}

Voter registration
According to the Secretary of State's office, Republicans comprise a majority of registered voters in Lebanon County.

United States House of Representatives
The county is located in the 9th congressional district, represented by Dan Meuser, Republican.

State Senate
All of the county falls within the 48th Senatorial District. The seat is currently held by Lebanon business owner and Republican Chris Gebhard.

State House of Representatives
The county is divided into the 101st, 102nd and 104th Pennsylvania House Districts.

101st District
The 101st District, served by Republican Frank Ryan, includes:

102nd District
The 102nd District, served by Republican Russ Diamond, includes:

104th District
The 104th District, which includes North Annville Twp. and East Hanover Twp., is represented by Republican Sue Helm.

County government
The county is governed by three commissioners, who are elected every four years from a slate of four candidates (two Democrats and two Republicans).  Other elected officials include County Controller, Sheriff, Coroner, Prothonotary and Clerk of Court, Recorder of Deeds, County Treasurer, and Register of Wills and Clerk of Orphans' Court.

Electoral history
For most of its history, Lebanon County has been one of the most Republican counties in Pennsylvania. The county is strongly Republican even by the standards of south-central Pennsylvania. It is very conservative for an urban county, having only supported a Democrat for president once since 1880. That came when Franklin D. Roosevelt won it in his 46-state landslide reelection; even then, FDR only carried it by 587 votes. The only other time since 1880 that the county has failed to support a Republican was in 1912, when the GOP was mortally divided and Theodore Roosevelt carried it on the Bull Moose ticket.

As a measure of how Republican the county has been, Democrats have only crossed the 40 percent mark three times since 1936–FDR in 1940 and 1944, and Lyndon B. Johnson in 1964. In the latter election, Lebanon County was one of only four counties in the state to vote for Barry Goldwater, along with Snyder, Union, and Wayne counties.

Republicans are no less dominant at the state and local level. The row offices and all but one county commission seat are held by Republicans, and there are no elected Democrats above the county level.

In the 2006 election for U.S. Senate, the county cast 21,756 votes (55.1%) for Republican Rick Santorum and 17,737 (44.9%) for Democrat Bob Casey, Jr., who won the race.  In that year's gubernatorial election, the county cast 22,775 votes (57.5%) for Republican Lynn Swann and 16,813 (42.5%) for Democrat Ed Rendell, who won the race.

In the 2004 presidential election, the county cast 37,089 votes (66.6%) for Republican George W. Bush and 18,109 (32.5%) for Democrat John Kerry.  In that same year's election for U.S. Senate, the county cast 35,336 votes (66.8%) for Republican Arlen Specter, 13,182 for Democrat Joe Hoeffel, 3,320 (6.3%) for Constitution Party candidate Jim Clymer, and 1,083 (2.0%) for Libertarian Betsy Summers. In the 2008 presidential election the county cast 34,314 votes (58.59%) for Republican John McCain and 23,310 votes (39.8%) for Barack Obama. In the 2016 presidential election, the county cast 38,804 votes (65,9 %) for Republican Donald Trump and 17,860 votes (30,3 %) for Democrat Hillary Clinton.

In the 2002 gubernatorial election, the county cast 22,659 votes (62.7%) for Republican Mike Fisher and 12,712 (35.2%) for Democrat Ed Rendell, who won the race.  In the 2002 race for the U.S. House of Representatives, Republican George Gekas received 21,733 votes (60.9%) from the county while Democrat Tim Holden received 13,945 (39.1%); Holden won.

Education

Colleges and universities
 Harrisburg Area Community College (Lebanon Campus)
 Lebanon Valley College
 Evangelical Seminary

Public school districts
 Annville-Cleona School District
 Cornwall-Lebanon School District
 Eastern Lebanon County School District
 Lebanon School District
 Northern Lebanon School District
 Palmyra Area School District

Communities

Under Pennsylvania law, there are four types of incorporated municipalities: cities, boroughs, townships, and, in at most two cases, towns. The following cities, boroughs and townships are located in Lebanon County:

City
 Lebanon (county seat)

Boroughs
 Cleona
 Cornwall
 Jonestown
 Mount Gretna
 Myerstown
 Palmyra
 Richland

Townships

 Annville
 Bethel
 Cold Spring
 East Hanover
 Heidelberg
 Jackson
 Millcreek
 North Annville
 North Cornwall
 North Lebanon
 North Londonderry
 South Annville
 South Lebanon
 South Londonderry
 Swatara
 Union
 West Cornwall
 West Lebanon

Census-designated places
Census-designated places are geographical areas designated by the U.S. Census Bureau for the purposes of compiling demographic data. They are not actual jurisdictions under Pennsylvania law.

 Annville
 Avon
 Campbelltown
 Fort Indiantown Gap
 Fredericksburg
 Hebron
 Lebanon South
 Mount Gretna Heights
 Newmanstown
 Pleasant Hill
 Quentin
 Sand Hill
 Schaefferstown
 Timber Hills

Other unincorporated communities

 Anthracite
 Bellegrove
 Beverly Heights
 Bordnersville
 Buffalo Springs
 Bunker Hill
 Canaan Grove
 Clear Spring
 Coffeetown
 Colebrook
 Coheva
 Dogtown
 East Hanover
 Ebenezer
 Edisonville
 Eustontown
 Flintville
 Fontana
 Freeport Mills
 Gold Mine
 Gravel Hill
 Greble
 Green Point
 Hamlin
 Harper Tavern
 Hauckville
 Heilmandale
 Indiantown
 Inwood
 Iona
 Johnstown
 Kleinfeltersville
 Kutztown
 Lawn
 Lickdale
 McGillstown
 Midway
 Millardsville
 Millbach
 Millbach Springs
 Mount Ararat
 Mount Pleasant
 Mount Wilson
 Mount Zion
 Murray
 Nacetown
 Ono
 Pansy Hill
 Plainville
 Prescott
 Reinoeldville
 Reistville
 Rocherty
 Rockwood
 Sheridan
 Shirksville
 Springhaven
 Stricklerstown
 Syner
 Union Water Works
 Upper Lawn
 Valley Glenn
 Waldeck
 Weavertown, Jackson Township
 Weavertown, North Lebanon Township
 West Jonestown
 Westmont
 Woodfort
 Zinns Mill

Ghost towns
 Cold Spring
 Rausch Gap

Population ranking
The population ranking of the following table is based on the 2010 census of Lebanon County.

† county seat

Parks and recreational places
 Memorial Lake State Park
 Swatara State Park
 Union Canal Tunnel Park
 Lions Lake Park
 Coleman's Memorial Park
 Stoever's Dam Park
 South Hill's Park
 Mount Gretna Lake
 Middle Creek Wildlife Management Area
 Lebanon Valley Rails to Trails
 Bordner Cabin

See also
 National Register of Historic Places listings in Lebanon County, Pennsylvania

References

External links
 
 County of Lebanon (official website)
 Lebanon County Pages
 Lebanon County Historical Society
 Lebanon County Tourism Promotion Agency
 Lebanon Valley Exposition Center and Fairgrounds
 

 
1813 establishments in Pennsylvania
Populated places established in 1813